State Bank of Hyderabad (SBH) was a regional bank in Hyderabad, with headquarters at Gunfoundry, Abids, Hyderabad, Telangana. Founded by the 7th Nizam of Hyderabad State, Mir Osman Ali Khan, it is now one of the five associate banks of State Bank of India (SBI) and was one of the nationalized banks in India. It was founded in 1941 as the Hyderabad State Bank. From 1956 until 31 March 2017, it had been an associate bank of the SBI, the largest such. The State Bank of Hyderabad was merged with SBI on 1 April 2017.

SBH had over 2,000 branches and about 18,000 employees. The bank's business had crossed Rs. 2.4 trillion as on 31.12.2015 with a net profit of Rs. 8.12 billion.

The bank had performed well in the decades before merger, winning several awards for its banking practices. Arundhati Bhattacharya was the chairman and Mani Palavesan the managing director at the time of merger.

It was the chief banker of Telangana.

History

The bank was the central bank of the erstwhile Nizam state under the name Hyderabad State Bank. It was established on 8 August 1941 under the Hyderabad State Bank Act, during the reign of the last Nizam of Hyderabad, Mir Osman Ali Khan. The bank managed the Osmania Sicca, the currency of Hyderabad state, which covered the present-day Telangana, some districts later known as Hyderabad-Karnataka of Karnataka and Marathwada of Maharashtra. (At the time a number of the princely states had their own currencies.) The bank also carried out commercial banking. The bank opened its first branch at Gunfoundry, Hyderabad on 5 April 1942. The Imperial Bank of India, which had established a branch in Hyderabad in 1868 and another in Secunderabad in 1906, provided officers and clerical staff in the initial stages, and later provided training for new recruits. The first secretary of Hyderabad State Bank was Muhammad Saleh Akbar Hydari, son of Sir Akbar Hydari. The gunfoundry building was designed by Mohammad Fayazuddin, an alumnus of Architectural Association School of Architecture, London.

After Partition, on 17 September 1948, the Indian Army conducted Operation Polo, which resulted in the annexation of Hyderabad to India. By 1950, the bank had some 50 branches, including branches in parts of the then Hyderabad State that would later be transferred to other states.

In 1953, the bank absorbed, by merger, the Mercantile Bank of Hyderabad, which Raja Pannalal Pitti had founded in 1935. (Some accounts give the year of founding as 1946 and that of merger as 1952). In the same year, the Bank started conducting government and Treasury business as agent for the Reserve Bank of India.

In 1956, the Reserve Bank of India took over the bank as its first subsidiary and renamed it State Bank of Hyderabad. That same year saw the break-up of Hyderabad State. Aurangabad, Beed, Parbhani, Nanded and Osmanabad merged with Maharashtra state. Kalaburagi, Bidar, Raichur, and parts of Osmanabad were merged with Karnataka state. The remaining districts formed part of Andhra Pradesh state, until the formation in 2015–16 of the state of Telangana. After the trifurcation, the branches of Hyderabad State Bank continued to conduct government transactions in their new states as well.

The Subsidiary Banks Act was passed in 1959. On 1 October 1959, SBH and the other banks of the princely states became subsidiaries of SBI.

Merger 
The plans to make SBI one of the top 50 banks in the World affected SBH. This plan was introduced in 2016, and on 15 February 2017, the Government of India ratified it. SBH finally merged with SBI on 31 March 2017, along with its co-associates State Bank of Travancore, State Bank of Mysore, State Bank of Patiala, State Bank of Bikaner and Jaipur, and Bharatiya Mahila Bank.

See also

Indian banking
List of banks in India
Hyderabadi rupee

References

External links
Official site

State Bank of India
Economy of Hyderabad, India
Economy of Telangana
Indian companies established in 1942
Banks established in 1942
Defunct banks of India
Establishments in Hyderabad State
2017 disestablishments in India